There's Something About Mary is a 1998 American romantic comedy directed by Peter Farrelly and Bobby Farrelly, who co-wrote it with Ed Decter and John J. Strauss. The film features Cameron Diaz as the title character, while Ben Stiller, Matt Dillon, Lee Evans, and Chris Elliott all play men who are in love with Mary, and vying for her affection.

There's Something About Mary was released theatrically on July 15, 1998, by 20th Century Fox. It received generally positive reviews from critics who praised its humor and Diaz's performance. The film became a major box office success, grossing over $369 million worldwide against its $23 million budget, becoming the fourth-highest-grossing film of the year. It is placed 27th in the American Film Institute's 100 Years, 100 Laughs: America's Funniest Movies, a list of the 100 funniest movies of the 20th century. In 2000, readers of Total Film magazine voted There's Something About Mary the fourth-greatest comedy film of all time.

Diaz won a New York Film Critics Circle Award for Best Actress, an MTV Movie Award for Best Performance, an American Comedy Award for Best Actress, a Blockbuster Entertainment Award for Best Actress. Her performance additionally was nominated for the Golden Globe Award for Best Actress – Motion Picture Musical or Comedy. The film was also nominated for a Golden Globe Award for Best Motion Picture – Musical or Comedy. It won four out of eight MTV Movie Awards, including Best Movie.

Plot
In 1985, 16-year-old Providence, Rhode Island high school student Ted Stroehmann is about to go on a prom date with his dream girl Mary Jensen when he gets his scrotum stuck in his zipper. He is hospitalized after managing to painfully unzip it, which causes him to miss their date. Ted subsequently loses contact with her.

Thirteen years later in 1998, Ted is a magazine writer and still in love with Mary. On the advice of his best friend Dom Woganowski, Ted hires private investigator Pat Healy to track her down. Pat discovers that she is an orthopedic surgeon living in Miami with her intellectually disabled brother Warren. After observing her for a few days, Pat also becomes fixated on her. He returns to Providence and lies to Ted about Mary, telling him she is overweight and has four kids by three different men. Pat quits his job and returns to Miami to pursue her. He resorts to lying, manipulation, and stalking to win Mary over.

Pat and Mary spend several weeks dating before her British architect friend Tucker exposes his lies. She ends their relationship after Tucker slanders Pat with false stories of being a suspected serial murderer. Infuriated over this, Pat confronts him and discovers Tucker actually is an American pizza delivery boy named Norm Phipps who also is infatuated with Mary. Years earlier, Norm intentionally injured himself in order to become her patient and get close to her. He pretends to still be disabled to stay close, and drive away potential suitors. 

Meanwhile, Ted finds out that Pat was lying about Mary and drives to Florida to see her. During the drive, he picks up a hitchhiker who leaves a dead body in his car. Ted is mistakenly arrested for the murder and bailed out by Dom after the hitchhiker confesses to being the killer. Ted finds Mary and they begin dating, prompting Pat and Norm to team up to drive Ted away. 

When Mary reads an anonymous letter revealing that Ted hired Pat to find her, she becomes upset and dumps him. Ted then angrily confronts Pat and Norm, who deny sending the letter, and Ted leaves in frustration. Dom, who is revealed to be Mary's ex-boyfriend "Woogie", later shows up in her apartment and admits to writing the letter. She previously had a restraining order against Dom after he became obsessed with her, which started again when Ted found her despite being married with kids.

Norm and Pat, listening outside, intervene and save Mary from Dom. Ted then arrives along with Brett Favre, an ex-boyfriend Mary dumped after Norm lied about him insulting Warren. Ted declares Favre should be with her, as he was the only one not to use deception to win over Mary. After reuniting Favre with her and leaving the other men defeated, Ted leaves in tears but she chases him down outside and says "I'd be happiest with you" before they kiss.

Cast

 Cameron Diaz as Mary Jensen, an orthopedic surgeon who becomes the obsession of several men.  She previously lived in Rhode Island but was forced to change her last name to "Matthews" and move to Florida to avoid a stalker.
 Matt Dillon as Pat Healy, a private investigator who becomes obsessed with Mary and quits his job to pursue her.
 Ben Stiller as Ted Stroehmann, a magazine writer who is still infatuated with Mary after missing his chance with her as a teenager.
 Lee Evans as Tucker/Norm Phipps, a pizza delivery man who meets Mary while delivering her a pizza and becomes obsessed with her. He adopts the persona of "Tucker", a British architect, and got his back injured to become one of Mary's patients and get closer to her. Norm hides how his injury has healed.
 Chris Elliott as Dom "Woogie" Woganowski, a lawyer who became obsessed with Mary to the point where she took out a restraining order against him.
 Lin Shaye as Magda, Mary's neighbor and friend.
 Jeffrey Tambor as Sully, Healy's friend and contact in Miami.
 Markie Post as Sheila Jensen, Mary's mother.
 W. Earl Brown as Warren Jensen, Mary's intellectually disabled brother who is very protective of his ears.
 Keith David as Charlie, Mary's stepfather.
 Sarah Silverman as Brenda, Mary's sarcastic best friend.
 Khandi Alexander as Joanie, another of Mary's friends.
 Richard Tyson as Detective Krevoy
 Rob Moran as Detective Stabler
 Willie Garson as Dr. Bob "Zit Face", Ted's chiropractor and friend from high-school
 Harland Williams as The Hitchhiker, an escaped mental patient and murderer (uncredited).
 Brett Favre as Himself, Mary's former boyfriend whom she broke up with after Tucker lied to her about him.
 Steve Sweeney as Police Officer
 Jonathan Richman as Jonathan, the singing narrator.
 Tommy Larkins as Tommy, a drummer.
 Lenny Clarke as Fireman.
 Richard Jenkins as Psychiatrist (uncredited).

Production
There's Something About Mary was directed by Peter and Bobby Farrelly, who had previously made Dumb and Dumber in 1994 and Kingpin in 1996. According to Bobby, the scene where Ted accidentally gets his scrotum stuck in his pants fly was inspired by a real incident, when their sister was listening to some records with some eighth grade students in the basement of their house: "One of the kids went up [to the bathroom] and he zipped himself up. He was in there for a long time. My dad, who was a doctor, actually had to go in and say, 'Hey, kid. You alright?'" Most of the film was shot in Miami, Florida. The Big Pink Restaurant is where Healy meets with Sully and the Miami-Dade Cultural Center was the location for the architecture exhibit Mary and Healy attended together. The hair gel scene was filmed at the Cardozo Hotel, while Churchill's Pub was used as a strip club for a scene with Healy. The makeup effects were the handiwork of makeup effects designer Tony Gardner.

Besides Ben Stiller, actors Owen Wilson and Jon Stewart were considered potential candidates for the role of Ted Stroehmann. Bill Murray was considered for the role of Pat Healy, but the Farrelly brothers thought he was too old for it. Vince Vaughn and Cuba Gooding Jr. were also considered for the role of Pat Healy. Because the Farrelly brothers were fans of the New England Patriots, they originally wanted to cast quarterback Drew Bledsoe as Mary's football-playing boyfriend, but he could not do it due to a mosh incident he had in a club. The Farrelly brothers later offered the role to Steve Young, but he turned it down due to the film's coarse nature. Ultimately, the role was given to Brett Favre. Chris Farley was considered for the role of Mary’s brother Warren, however his health was in a rapid decline due to his drug addictions and he was forced to turn down the role. He died in December 1997 in the middle of the film's production.

Reception

Box office
Upon its release, There's Something About Mary ranked in fourth place behind Armageddon, Lethal Weapon 4 and The Mask of Zorro, collecting $13.7 million during its opening weekend, combined with $17.8 million from its first five days. During Labor Day record, the film reached the number one spot, making $10.9 million and beating Blade. There's Something About Mary was 1998's third-highest-grossing film in North America as well as the fourth highest-grossing film of the year globally. The film made $369million worldwide on a budget of $23million, with $176million coming from the U.S. and Canada. It was released in the United Kingdom on September 25, 1998, and topped the country's box office for the next two weekends.

Critical response
The film received positive reviews from critics. Rotten Tomatoes gives it a "Certified Fresh" score of 84% based on 85 reviews, and an average rating of 7.06/10, with the consensus: "There's Something About Mary proves that unrelentingly, unabashedly puerile humor doesn't necessarily come at the expense of a film's heart." Metacritic gives the film a score of 69 out of 100 based on reviews from 29 critics. Audiences polled by CinemaScore gave the film an average grade of "B+" on an A+ to F scale.

Roger Ebert gave it three out of four stars, stating "What a blessed relief is laughter. It flies in the face of manners, values, political correctness and decorum. It exposes us for what we are, the only animal with a sense of humor."

Gene Siskel ranked the film number 9 on his 10 Best films of 1998 (the final "best of" list he did before passing away).

Accolades
The film is recognized by American Film Institute in these lists:
 2000: AFI's 100 Years...100 Laughs – #27
 2002: AFI's 100 Years...100 Passions – Nominated
 2007: AFI's 100 Years...100 Movies (10th Anniversary Edition) – Nominated
 2008: AFI's 10 Top 10 – Nominated Romantic Comedy Film

Soundtrack
 "There's Something About Mary" (Jonathan Richman) – 1:47
 "How to Survive a Broken Heart" (Ben Lee) – 2:47
 "Every Day Should Be a Holiday" (The Dandy Warhols) – 4:02
 "Everything Shines" (The Push Stars) – 2:27
 "This Is the Day" (Ivy) – 3:33
 "Is She Really Going Out with Him?" (Joe Jackson) – 3:36
 "True Love Is Not Nice" (Jonathan Richman) – 2:13
 "History Repeating" (The Propellerheads feat. Shirley Bassey) – 4:04
 "If I Could Talk I'd Tell You" (The Lemonheads) – 2:51
 "Mary's Prayer" (Danny Wilson) – 3:54
 "Margo's Waltz" (Lloyd Cole) – 4:01
 "Speed Queen" (Zuba) – 3:44
 "Let Her Go Into the Darkness" (Jonathan Richman) – 1:19
 "Build Me Up Buttercup" (The Foundations) – 2:59

References

External links

 
 
 
 
 
 

1990s English-language films
1990s sex comedy films
1998 romantic comedy films
1998 films
20th Century Fox films
American romantic comedy films
American sex comedy films
American slapstick comedy films
Films about stalking
Films directed by the Farrelly brothers
Films set in 1985
Films set in 1998
Films set in Florida
Films set in Miami
Films set in Rhode Island
Films shot in Miami
Films shot in Rhode Island
Films with screenplays by the Farrelly brothers
1990s American films